Yaakob bin Sapari (born 14 August 1961) is a Malaysian politician and was served as Selangor State Legislative Assemblyman for two terms. From 2008 until 2013, he was appointed as Selangor State Executive Councillor. When Pakatan Harapan become the federal government, he appointed as Senator since 2018 until his term end in 2021.

Election results

References

1961 births
Living people
Malaysian people of Malay descent
People's Justice Party (Malaysia) politicians
21st-century Malaysian politicians
Members of the Selangor State Legislative Assembly
Selangor state executive councillors
Members of the Dewan Negara
University of Putra Malaysia alumni